Omorgus strzeleckensis is a species of hide beetle in the subfamily Omorginae.

References

strzeleckensis
Beetles described in 1895